The equestrian statue of Prince George, Duke of Cambridge is a life-size memorial by Adrian Jones, installed in Whitehall, London.

History
Prince Arthur, Duke of Connaught and Strathearn was made chairman of the committee to erect a memorial to his cousin Prince George, Duke of Cambridge. Architect John Belcher and sculptor Adrian Jones collaborated on the project. Belcher led on the original proposal in 1905, in which he requested that Westminster City Council should allow the construction of the statue outside Horse Guards on Whitehall. In July 1906, while the statue was being sculpted at Jones' studio on Church Street, Chelsea, he was visited on one occasion by Queen Alexandra, accompanied by her daughter Princess Victoria, Crown Princess Sophia of Greece, Duchess of Sparta, and Prince George of Greece and Denmark.

By the following October, the committee changed its mind on the location of the statue. The new War Office building had opened in August, and they requested an amendment to the permission granted by Westminster City Council for a change of building location to place it outside that building instead. Once again, this request was approved. The construction of the plinth was contracted out to a building company, Pethick Brothers, and it was completed on 18 May 1907. The statue was added shortly afterwards during the night, and then obscured until the unveiling. It was unveiled on 15 June 1907 by King Edward VII, who had been escorted from Buckingham Palace by a detachment of 2nd Life Guards. He was accompanied on the journey and at the ceremony by Queen Alexandria, Princess Victoria, Edward, Prince of Wales, the Duke of Connaught and Strathearn, and Prince Christian of Schleswig-Holstein.

The group was led by Field Marshall Wilhelm von Hahnke. A variety of British military personnel were also present, including Major-General Wykeham Leigh Pemberton. During the ceremony, the King declared, "The statue I am about to unveil is committed to the care of the City of Westminster." This was unexpected, as the statue was actually owned by the Office of Works. Some two weeks passed before the two offices came to agreement that it would be handed back from the City of Westminster to the Office of Works.

In November 2012, a nude man mounted the statue for more than an hour until he was persuaded to come down and was taken into police custody.

Design
Jones sculpted the Duke of Cambridge on horseback, while wearing the full-uniform of a Field Marshal. It included his medals, such as four orders of knighthood and his campaign medals. The sculpture holds in its hand a baton, this was intended to represent the one which was presented to the Duke's father by King William IV, and in the other hand it holds the reins of the horse. On the sides of the plinth there are two bas-relief panels showing the Duke's connection with the Grenadier Guards and the 17th Lancers.

See also
 1907 in art

References

External links

 Duke of Cambridge – Whitehall, London, UK at Waymarking
 Statue: George, Duke of Cambridge at London Remembers

1907 establishments in England
1907 sculptures
Equestrian statues in the United Kingdom
Cambridge
Grade II listed monuments and memorials
Granite sculptures in the United Kingdom
Monuments and memorials in London
Outdoor sculptures in London
Cambridge
Statues of military officers
Whitehall